Facial hair in the military has been at various times common, prohibited, or an integral part of the uniform.

Asia

India

In the armed forces and police of India, male Sikh servicemen are allowed to wear full beards as their religion expressly requires followers to do so. However, they are specifically required to "dress up their hair and beard properly".

Non-Sikh personnel are allowed to grow whiskers and mustaches, with the only regulation being that they "will be of moderate length". In December 2003, the Supreme Court of India ruled that Muslims in uniform could grow beards, although the rules have since been changed again (via a Supreme Court ruling in 2018) to once again allow only Sikhs to wear beards. Thus, non-Sikhs serving in the Indian Army or Indian Air Force are not permitted to wear beards. However, Army personnel on active duty are sometimes exempt from facial hair regulations for the duration of their tour of duty if their deployment makes access to such facilities difficult. Indian Navy personnel are allowed to grow beards subject to the permission of their commanding officer.

Exceptions for other religions are made in the case of special forces operatives such as the Indian Army's Para (Special Forces), who are allowed to grow beards.

Iran

Beards are permitted in the Armed Forces of the Islamic Republic of Iran. As a sign of their ideological motivation, Islamic Revolutionary Guard Corps (Sepah) personnel used to tend to wear full beards, while the Islamic Republic of Iran Army (Artesh) personnel are usually trimmed or wear mustaches.

Iraq
Beards to a certain length were traditionally permitted in the Iraqi security forces, however, a ban was brought into effect in April 2012 due to public associations between beards and certain sectarian militias in Iraq. As a result of the change, Iraqi soldiers and police must now be clean shaven.
Under the dictatorship of Saddam Hussein, beards were not allowed in the army and in military service, only a mustache.

Israel

The IDF prohibits the growing of facial hair unless a special request form has been filed and approved. The requests can be for religious reasons (full beard only), health reasons such as acne (no restrictions on facial hair styles), and on the grounds of "free will", which means the facial hair (mustache, a goatee or a full beard all of which must be well groomed) has to be part of the soldiers identity and part of his self-esteem. If the request is due to health reasons, it must be approved by the military doctor and lasts up to half a year. If the request is due to "free will", it must be approved by a unit commander at the rank of lieutenant colonel or above and a recommendation must be made by an officer associated with the soldier at the rank of lieutenant (usually in a combat unit). For religious requests, the soldier is interviewed by a military rabbi to determine if the soldier fits the criteria for an exemption. If approved, a recommendation is made by the officer associated with the soldier and finally approved by the unit commander at the rank of lieutenant colonel or above. In the past, the exemption from shaving on the religious reasons or on the grounds of "free will" lasted for the duration of the soldier's entire service. However, as of 2020, the exemption from shaving has to be renewed every year, and the exemption also expires if the soldier shaves willingly.

Lebanon
Beards are not allowed in the Lebanese Armed Forces. Only trimmed moustaches that don't pass the upper lip are permitted and a special allowance is paid as a result.

Pakistan

Beards are permitted in Pakistan Army. They are allowed only if a special request is approved. The requests are generally for religious reasons or for health reasons, such as acne or skin allergy. Once the form has been approved applicant is not allowed to shave back. There is a special allowance for bigger moustaches but they must be neat and trimmed.

Philippines
Facial hair is disallowed in the Armed Forces of the Philippines. The regulation applies to all personnel regardless of rank and violation can be grounds for disciplinary action.

Nepal

In the past, moustaches have been popular with Gorkhali Army commanders and soldiers. Military commanders of Kshatriya order (called Kshetri in Nepal) especially of five Kaji noble family Thapa, Pande, Kunwar, Basnet and Bista used to linked moustaches to dignity.

However, with changing times, it became apparent that facial hair can break seals on gas masks, and thus a liability. Currently, moustaches and beards are not within regulations in the Nepal Army. Thus regulations do not allow for facial hair. Despite this, many soldiers can still be spotted with facial hair, especially when stationed in remote areas, away from the eyes of the press, and if their unit commanders are willing to look the other way.

Singapore
Moustaches, but not beards, are permitted in the Singapore Army. If a moustache is kept, it has to be kept neatly trimmed and of moderate length. Exception for beards are allowed for those in the Sikh faith.

South Korea
Beards are not allowed in the South Korean Armed Forces.

Sri Lanka
The Navy does not allow moustaches alone but does allow full-set beards. Moustaches but not beards are permitted in the Army and Air Force. However, members of the Commando and Special Forces regiments are allowed to wear beards if based outside their home camps.

Syria
Beards are not allowed in the Syrian Army. Trimmed moustaches, however, are allowed.

Turkey
All Turkish Armed Forces personnel are required to be clean-shaven at all times.

Europe

Belgium

The Belgian Armed Forces permits moustaches and beards, but they have to be properly trimmed.

Austria
The Austrian Armed Forces permits moustaches, beards and sideburns, as long as they are neatly trimmed.

Croatia
The Armed Forces of Croatia permit moustaches for soldiers and non-commissioned officers. Officers are allowed to wear neatly trimmed beards. Furthermore, beards are not only allowed but fully recommended for members of special operations teams when deployed.

Czech Republic

The Army of the Czech Republic permits moustaches, sideburns or a neat full beard of a natural colour. A moustache has to be trimmed so it would not exceed the lower margin of the upper lip. Sideburns may not reach under the middle of each auricle. Hairs of sideburns and goatee may not exceed 2 cm (0.787 inch) in length.

Denmark

Danish Army personnel are generally allowed to wear any well-kept beard. Stubble, however, is not allowed. Full beards were popular among units deployed in Afghanistan, as it is easier to maintain when in the field. This also helped to break down cultural barriers between the Danish and the Afghans, as most Afghan men wear full beards, and because many Danes grow red-coloured beards, an Afghan symbol of bravery.

Soldiers who belong to Den Kongelige Livgarde (The Royal Life Guards) are not allowed to have beards when on guard duty.
Additionally, Danish soldiers are not required to have short haircuts, though most have.

Estonia
The Estonian Defence Forces allow active duty members to grow facial hair, but it has to be trimmed and groomed properly. As of 2021, conscripts are also allowed to grow facial hair. Head hair is not allowed to cover the ears and back of the neck.

Finland
The regulations of the Finnish Defence Forces (Rule 91) prohibit the growing of a moustache, a beard or long hair. Reservists can grow a moustache, a beard or long hair.

France
Since the Napoleonic era and throughout the 19th century, sappers (combat engineers) of the French Army could wear full beards. Elite troops, such as grenadiers, had to wear large moustaches. Infantry chasseurs were asked to wear moustaches and goatees; and hussars, in addition to their moustache, usually wore two braids in front of each ear, to protect their neck from sword slashes. These traditions were gradually abandoned since the beginning of the 20th century, except for the French Foreign Legion sappers (see below).

The "decree № 75-675 regarding regulations for general discipline in the Armies of 28 July 1975, modified" regulates facial hair in the French armed forces. Military personnel are allowed to grow a beard or moustache only during periods when they are out of uniform. The beard must be "correctly trimmed", and provisions are stated for a possible ban of beards by the military authorities to ensure compatibility with certain equipment.

However, within the Foreign Legion, sappers are traditionally encouraged to grow a large beard. Sappers chosen to participate in the Bastille Day parade are in fact specifically asked to stop shaving so they will have a full beard when they march down the Champs-Élysées.

The moustache was an obligation for gendarmes until 1933, hence their nickname of "les moustaches". By tradition, some gendarmes may still grow a moustache.

Submariners may be bearded, clean-shaven, or "patrol-bearded", growing a beard for the time of a patrol in reminiscence of the time of the diesel submarines whose cramped space allowed for rustic and minimal personal care.

French soldiers of the First World War were known by the nickname poilu, meaning "hairy one" in reference to their facial hair.

Germany
Under Nazi rule, the German military only permitted a small, neatly trimmed moustache, though such regulations were often relaxed under field conditions. The latter was particularly true in the case of the Kriegsmarine and Gebirgsjäger. Growth of a full beard was the norm for U-boat crews on active duty, though facial hair was expected to be shaved off soon after reaching port.

The present-day regulations of the Bundeswehr allow soldiers to grow a beard on condition that it is not long and is unobtrusive and well-kept. Beards must not impact the proper use of any military equipment, such as a gas mask. Moreover, stubble may not be shown; thus a clean-shaven soldier who wants to start growing a beard must do so during his furlough.

Greece

In the Greek armed forces, only the navy permits military personnel to wear a beard. Neatly trimmed moustaches are the only facial hair permitted in the army and air force.

Hungary 
In the Hungarian Defence Forces (Magyar Honvédség), personnel are permitted to wear facial hair. However, the neck must be shaven and the maximum length is 1.5 cm. In some cases, unit commanders can prohibit the growing of beards, but not moustaches.

Ireland
The growing of beards is not permitted in any branch of the Irish Defence Forces with exception of the Army Ranger Wing. Moustaches are permitted with permission. Sideburns are not allowed beyond ear length.

Italy

In the Italian armed forces, beards or moustaches are allowed, but well taken care of; without beards, the sideburns should reach the middle of the tragus. Stubble is permitted outside of ceremonial occasions.

Netherlands
In the Royal Netherlands Army, officers and soldiers may only grow beards after permission has been obtained. Automatic permission is given for certain medical conditions. Mustaches may be grown without asking permission. Beards are worn at times by the Royal Netherlands Marines and by Royal Netherlands Navy personnel. All facial hair in the Netherlands armed forces is subject to instant removal when operational circumstances demand it. Recent operations in Afghanistan under the ISAF have seen a trend of growing "tour beards", both for bonding and as a way of advancing contacts with the Afghan population, who regard a full beard as a sign of manhood. A beard without a mustache is uncommon in the Netherlands.

Norway

The Royal Guard is required to be clean-shaven. Most operative personnel are not allowed to wear beards (so as not to interfere with gas masks) unless the soldier obtains express permission to grow his beard from a high-ranking officer; or the  soldier already has a beard upon his enlistment and requests to continue growing it or maintain it at its present length. However during enduring operations like in Afghanistan, many soldiers have grown full beards.

Poland
According to General Regulation of Polish Armed Forces only neatly trimmed moustaches are allowed without permission. Full beard is allowed only when permitted by Unit Commander or when based on written medical statement. However, beards when grown also shall be neatly trimmed.

Many Polish soldiers tended to grow "tour beards" when deployed to Iraq, Afghanistan or Kosovo.

Portugal
Military personnel in the Portuguese Armed Forces can ask permission to grow a beard or moustaches. It was quite common until the First World War for any soldier to have a beard or moustache. With the 21st century Middle East Military Operations growing a beard has become again more common, both in the Special Forces community and regular young soldiers in the Army, Navy and Air Force. Some Paratroopers use a very distinct moustache.

Russia

Traditionally, Russian soldiers of Russian Tsardom wore beards, but during the reign of Peter the Great they were completely banned in the army and even for civilians, except members of the clergy. Peter did however make moustaches a requirement for every soldier excluding officers, and all of the Russian infantry of the imperial reign could be seen sporting them, often growing beyond the upper-lip. Although the typical image of the imperial Russian soldier shown him with a beard, they were not universally permitted until 1895. Cavalrymen also met these requirements. Officers and staff on the other hand grew whatever hair they wished, and generally kept with the fashion of the time.

Spain
The Spanish Armed Forces allow facial hair, under article 40 of the Royal Ordinances. Dress and grooming standards for Spanish ISAF forces have been relaxed to help the troops blend in better with the local Muslim population.

Serbia
In the Serbian Armed Forces neatly trimmed mustaches are the only facial hair permitted, remaining of the face must be cleanly shaved in every occasion except when legitimate reasons prevent it (e.g. winter field operations, war operations), but soldiers do have to shave the first chance that situation permits. Priests of any denomination are allowed to have beards if their religion requires it, but it still has to be trimmed and well-groomed.

Sweden

The regulations require personnel to be "well shaved" (välrakad). Within the Royal Guard (Högvakten), the royal companies (Livkomp) and other personnel performing ceremonial duties, temporary or on a regular basis, the regulations are strictly enforced.

Within other units, beards tend to be allowed under the discretion of the company commander (or other higher ranking commander). The general provisions of well-managed appearance is enforced also when it comes to beards.

Soldiers are however by practice allowed to grow beards during service abroad, for example in Afghanistan.

The motivation for the regulation prohibiting beard is that it interferes with the gas-mask and makes it difficult to achieve a perfect air-tight fit. Shorter beard and gun grease or ointment is one remedy but will increase the time for the application of the gas-mask which in turn will put bearded personnel at increased risk of exposure.

Switzerland
The Swiss Armed Forces permits moustaches, beards and sideburns, as long as they are neatly trimmed.

Ukraine
 
Ukrainian Cossacks traditionally have a distinctive facial hair style – long "cossack" moustache was very popular across Ukraine during Middle Ages until modern times. The tradition allegedly dates back at least to the times of prince of Kyevan Rus' Sviatoslav I of Kiev famous for his military campaigns in the east and south. Sviatoslav had distinctive moustache and hair style (oseledets or chupryna) that almost every Ukrainian cossack had centuries after his times (although Svyatoslav had lived in 10th century, while Cossacks appear on the historical scene only since the 15th century).

The length of the cossack moustache was important – the longer the better. Sometimes one had to tuck them away behind one's ears.

Volodymyr Zelenskyy has been seen with a beard during the 2022 Russian invasion of Ukraine.

Some cossacks were wearing beards as well, but this type of facial hair was not very popular in Ukraine in general and in Ukraine's military in particular.

United Kingdom

The Royal Navy has always allowed beards, and since the 1850s has permitted its members to wear only a "full set" (i.e., a full beard and moustache). A beard or moustache may not be worn without the other and the beard must be full (i.e., cover the whole jawline) and joined to the moustache. The individual must seek permission from his commanding officer to stop shaving and if, after a fortnight without shaving, it becomes clear that the individual cannot grow a proper full set, the commanding officer may order him to shave it off.

Until the mid-19th century, facial hair was unusual in the British Army, except for the infantry pioneers, who traditionally grew beards. A small minority of officers wore moustaches. During the 1800s, the attitude to facial hair changed as a result of the Indian and Asian Wars. Many Middle Eastern and Indian cultures associated facial hair with wisdom and power. As a result, facial hair, moustaches and side whiskers in particular, became increasingly common on British soldiers stationed in Asia. In the mid-19th century, during the Crimean War, all ranks were encouraged to grow large moustaches, and full beards during winter.

After the Crimean war, regulations were introduced that forbade serving soldiers of all ranks from shaving above their top lip, in essence making moustaches compulsory for those who could grow them, although beards were later forbidden. This remained in place until 1916, when the regulation was abolished by an Army Order dated 6 October 1916. It was issued by Lieutenant-General Sir Nevil Macready, Adjutant-General to the Forces, who loathed his own moustache and immediately shaved it off. However, there is considerable evidence in photographs and film footage that the earlier regulations were widely ignored and that many British soldiers of all ranks were clean-shaven even before 1916.

Since that time, the British Army and Royal Marines, and until 2019 the Royal Air Force, have allowed moustaches only. Exceptions are beards grown for medical reasons, such as temporary skin irritations, or for religious reasons (usually by Sikhs or Muslims), although, in the event of conflict in which the use of chemical or biological weapons is likely, they may be required to shave a strip around the seal of a respirator. Queen's Regulations state that, "If a moustache is worn, it is to be trimmed and not below the line of the lower lip", giving rise to the fashion for handlebar moustaches, especially in the RAF where they are still sometimes seen. These were once very common, and the archetypal RAF fighter pilot of the Second World War wore one. Although also technically against regulations, the "full set moustache" (i.e., a large moustache linked to mutton chop side whiskers, but with a shaved chin) is also still sometimes seen, and the battalion bugle majors of The Rifles, or the other rifle regiments which preceded it, are expected to wear them by regimental tradition.

Infantry pioneer warrant officers, colour sergeants and sergeants traditionally wear and are permitted to wear beards; although not compulsory, most do wear them. In some Scottish and Irish infantry regiments, it is either permitted or expected, by regimental tradition, for the drum major, pipe major, and/or commanding officer's piper to wear a beard. The goat majors in Welsh regiments also by tradition wear beards. As with the Royal Navy, all beards worn by soldiers must be a "full set". Beards are also permitted to special forces when on covert intelligence operations or behind enemy lines. On 12 August 2019, the Royal Air Force announced that all personnel would henceforth be permitted to wear full set beards, although unlike the Royal Navy moustaches without beards are also still permitted.

Members of the royal family, who are expected to wear military uniforms on ceremonial occasions even long after their formal military service is complete, have sometimes worn beards with Army, RAF or Royal Marines uniform (e.g. King Edward VII, King George V, Prince Michael of Kent, Prince Harry).

Americas

Chile
Beards and sideburns are banned since the start of the 20th century, yet moustaches are allowed to all permanent personnel of all 3 of the chilean armed forces, since the 2002 "Reglamento de Vestuario y Equipo" or lawbook of clothing and equipment "The use of moustache is allowed for all ranks, having it trimmed just above the lip"

Argentina
Beards and sideburns are banned in all military and police forces since the early 20th century. A clean-shaved face is considered part of a spirit of order, hygiene and discipline. Stubble is also considered unacceptable and controlled with severity. Well-trimmed moustaches are allowed in most of these branches, although in some cases this is a privilege of officers and sub-officers, and it's not allowed to be grown while on duty.

Before the end of 20th century, the Navy became a singularity within the Argentine Armed Forces as Adm. Joaquín Stella, then Navy Chief of Staff allowed beards in 2000 for officers with ranks above Teniente de Corbeta (Ensign), according to Section 1.10.1.1 of the Navy Uniform regulations (R.A-1-001). Adm. Stella gave the example himself by becoming the first bearded Argentine admiral since Adm. Sáenz Valiente in the 1920s. Non commissioned officers can wear beards from Suboficial Segundo (Petty Officer) rank, and upwards.

Protocol still requires officers to appear clean-shaved on duty, thus forcing those who choose to sport beards to grow them while on leave. Both full beards and goatees are allowed, as long as they proffer a professional, non-eccentric image. Nowadays, bearded Argentine naval and marine officers and senior NCO's are a relatively common sight.

Brazil
The Brazilian Army, Brazilian Navy and Brazilian Air Force permit moustaches, as long as they are trimmed to just above the upper lip. Recruits, however, may not wear moustaches. Beards are generally not allowed except for special exceptions, such as covering a deformity. In such cases, a beard is permitted under authorization.

Canada

Effective 25 September 2018, the wearing of a beard is authorized for all CAF members upon attainment of their operationally functional point (OFP) or having completed developmental period one, whichever comes last. However, Commanders of Commands, Task Force Commanders and Commanding Officers retain the right to order restrictions on the wearing of a beard to meet safety and operational requirements. This includes restrictions pertaining to operations and training where, in a chemical biological radiological nuclear (CBRN) environment or CBRN training environment, a beard can be ordered to be removed to ensure force protection on operations or training. Such restrictions will be as temporary as feasible (E.G. as long as the entire duration of an operational tour in a CBRN environment or as short as a single training day for CBRN operations). Where current CAF equipment capabilities cannot ensure force protection or the ability to effectively employ safety systems while wearing a beard, beard restrictions for members using that equipment for operational or safety reasons may be put in place by a Commanding Officer.

In no case is a beard permitted without a moustache, and only full beards may be worn (not goatees, van dykes, etc.) Beards are also allowed to be worn by personnel conducting OPFOR duties.

New regulations set to take effect 6 September 2022 will allow the wearing of sideburns, beards, moustaches and goatees, or combination of style, for all members of the CAF from recruitment to release. There is no maximum or minimum length. Only, they must be kept neatly groomed and symmetrical in style while always complying with safety requirements and operational requirements.

Colombia
Only after the rank of captain, officers in the Army, Air Force and Police are allowed to wear a well trimmed moustache that doesn't grow over the upper lip. Beards and sideburns are not allowed. The Navy does not allow facial hair.

Mexico
Beards and sideburns are not permitted by the regular Mexican military, without exception. Soldiers at any rank must be clean-shaven and short haired.

United States

Excluding limited exemptions for religious accommodation, the United States Army, Air Force, and Marine Corps have policies that prohibit beards on the basis of hygiene and the necessity of a good seal for chemical weapon protective masks. The official position is that uniform personal appearance and grooming contribute to discipline and a sense of camaraderie.

All branches of the U.S. military currently prohibit beards for a vast majority of recruits, although some mustaches are still allowed, based on policies that were initiated during the period of World War I.

On 10 November 1970, Chief of Naval Operations (CNO) Elmo Zumwalt explicitly authorized beards for active duty Naval personnel, in his Z-gram number 57, "Elimination of Demeaning or Abrasive Regulation," although his position was that they were already implicitly allowed based on policy changes made by his predecessor, Thomas H. Moorer:

1. Those demeaning or abrasive regulations generally referred to in the fleet as "Mickey Mouse" or "Chicken" regs have, in my judgment, done almost as much to cause dissatisfaction among our personnel as have extended family separation and low pay scales. I desire to eliminate many of the most abrasive policies, standardize others which are inconsistently enforced, and provide some general guidance which reflects my conviction that if we are to place the importance and responsibility of "the person" in proper perspective in the more efficient Navy we are seeking, the worth and personal dignity of the individual must be forcefully reaffirmed. The policy changes below are effective immediately and will be amplified by more detailed implementing directives to be issued separately.
2. It appears that my predecessor's guidance in May on the subject of haircuts, beards and sideburns is insufficiently understood and, for this reason, I want to restate what I believed to be explicit: in the case of haircuts, sideburns, and contemporary clothing styles, my view is that we must learn to adapt to changing fashions. I will not countenance the rights or privileges of any officers or enlisted men being abrogated in any way because they choose to grow sideburns or neatly trimmed beards or moustaches or because preferences in neat clothing styles are at variance with the taste of their seniors, nor will I countenance any personnel being in any way penalized during the time they are growing beards, moustaches, or sideburns.

The U.S. Coast Guard allowed beards until 1986, when they were banned by Commandant Admiral Paul Yost. The majority of police forces in the United States still ban their officers from wearing beards.

Mustaches are generally allowed in both the military and police forces (except for those undergoing basic training), so long as they are well-groomed. U.S. Army regulations, for example, require that a mustaches be "neatly trimmed, tapered, and tidy", and that "no portion of the mustache will cover the upper lip line, extend sideways beyond a vertical line drawn upward from the corners of the mouth...or extend above a parallel line at the lowest portion of the nose."

Those with skin conditions such as pseudofolliculitis barbae or severe acne are allowed to maintain short facial hair with the permission of a doctor or medic, but no shaping is allowed, only trimming with an electric razor, or approved regular razor. 1/8–1/4 of an inch (1.6 mm to 3.2 mm) is usually the standard for this condition.

Exceptions for religious accommodation

In 2010, the Army granted waivers for a number of Sikh soldiers and one Muslim soldier, permitting them to have beards (and in the case of the Sikh soldiers, to have "unshorn" hair covered by turbans). In 2010, a rabbi filed suit against the army for permission to be commissioned as a Jewish chaplain without shaving his beard, noting (among other issues) that another Jewish chaplain, Colonel Jacob Goldstein, has been serving (first in the New York State National Guard and later in the United States Army Reserve) since 1977 with a beard. Effective 22 January 2014, the U.S. military expanded its policies on religious accommodation and now allows all officer and enlisted personnel to request permission to wear beards and articles of clothing for religious reasons.

Oceania

Australia
Beards are normally not allowed in the Australian Army. Moustaches may be worn. However, moustaches can not be grown past the ends of the top lip. Sideburns are not to be grown past the point where the bottom of the ear connects to the facial skin. In some circumstances, such as medical or religious reasons, beards may be permitted. Exceptions to the rule are assault pioneers and special forces that are deployed. 

In the Royal Australian Navy, serving members may grow a beard but only with approval from their commanding officer. The beard must be complete, joined from sideburns, covering the chin and joining the moustache. A moustache on its own is not permitted. As of 1 November 2022, serving Royal Australian Air Force members may seek approval to grow a beard from their commanding officer, following the same standards as the Navy; previously, only moustaches were permitted.

See also
 Hair related
 Beard and haircut laws by country
 Beard oil
 Discrimination based on hair texture
 List of facial hairstyles
 List of hairstyles
 Moustache styles
 Pigtail Ordinance

 General
 Clothing laws by country
 Dress code
 Emo killings in Iraq

References

Facial hair
Uniforms